The flag of Earth is a concept of a possible flag design meant to symbolize the planet Earth, humankind, or a possible world government.

Proposed flags

John McConnell's Earth Flag 

In 1969, peace activist John McConnell proposed his design titled the Earth Flag. The current version of the flag consists of The Blue Marble, a photograph of Earth taken on 7 December 1972 by the crew of the Apollo 17 on its way to the Moon. The planet is placed on the dark blue background. Prior to 1973, the flag design used the photography no. 69HC487, taken by the crew of the Apollo 10 on 18 May 1969. The early flag versions also had more simplified designs, depicting white outlines of the clouds, on the light blue circle, instead of more detailed photography of the planet.

The design debuted at the Moon Watch event in the Central Park, in the New York City, on 20 July 1969, during which, people watched and celebrated the first Moon landing done by the crew of the Apollo 11. On 22 April 1970, McConnell organized the first Earth Day, in San Francisco, California at which his flags were used. Since then, the flag has become widely associated with Earth Day. In 1992, astronaut Anatoly Berezovoy carried the Earth Flag with him during his time in space.

International Flag of Planet Earth 

In 2015, designer Oskar Pernefeldt proposed a flag called the International Flag of Planet Earth. The design consists of seven rings, linked to each other. It includes one circle in the middle, and six circles around it, forming the shape of a flower. The shape represents the life on the planet, and the connection of everything on it to everything else. The number of circles represents the seven continents of the planet. The symbol is placed on a dark blue background, which represents water, the essential of the planet's life, and the oceans, which cover most of the surface of Earth. Additionally, the outer rings together form a circle, representing Earth, with a blue background, representing the universe. The aspect ratio of the height of the flag to its width equals 2:3.

Oskar Pernefeldt designed the flag as a graduate thesis, but the flag quickly became popular internationally. The website Penerfeldt created for the flag received more than half a million views in its first 24 hours, and it received significant media attention. Many outlets speculated about the design's use in space travel, particularly humans reaching Mars.

The International Flag of Planet Earth Organization (IFOPE-O) is a registered 501(c)(4) nonprofit organization founded by Pernefeldt to promote the proposal. It's mission is to make this flag recognized as the flag of Earth, by serving as its awareness agency

James W. Cadle's Flag of Earth 

In 1970, James W. Cadle, a farmer from Homer, Illinois, proposed his version of the flag of Earth, that consisted of a blue circle representing the Earth, placed in the centre of the flag, in front of a segment of a larger yellow circle, representing the Sun, placed on the left side of the map, and a smaller white circle, representing the Moon, located in the right bottom corner of the flag, with everything placed on a black background. It gained popularity among the SETI researchers and is flown of numerous SETI research facilities around the world. Notably, the flag flies at the Ohio State University Radio Observatory, in Delaware, Ohio. On 23 December 1996, in honour of the death of Carl Sagan, three days prior, the flag had been flown there at the half-mast.

The flag was originally distributed by Earth Flag Co. International, which was founded by Cadle. The design had entered the public domain in 2003. Following Cadle's death, the flag distribution is being continued by North American Astrophysical Observatory.

World Peace Flag of Earth 

In 1913, James William van Kirk, a Methodist minister from Youngstown designed the first known flag proposed to the peace flag and the flag of Earth. The design includes the rainbow flag on the left, consisting of red, green, yellow, orange, blue, purple, and pink stripes. To the right is depicted a brown globe with coordinate grid including the latitude lines, that go from the longitude lines of the north and south polar circles. In the middle of the globe is placed a white horizontal stripe. The globe is connected to the rainbow flag via thin white stripes going from the side of the white stripe on the globe, to the outher boundaries of the coloured stripes on the rainbow flag. Both object are placed on the dark blue background with 46 stars surrounding them.

In 1913, and 1929, Kirk  made a peace tour through Europe with his flag, promoting "the brotherhood of man and the Fatherhood of God". The Universal Peace Congress adopted Kirk's design as its official World Peace Flag. It was subsequently adopted by the American Peace Society as well as other groups.

The World Flag 

In 1988, Paul Carroll proposed a design titled The World Flag, that combined the flags of 159 member states of the United Nations. It was created to promote the global unity and cooperation. The flag depicted the national flags placed next to each other. In the centre of the flag was placed a Dymaxion map of the world. The design was updated in the 1992, expanding number of flags included to the total of 230, adding all national flags used at the time, and additionally including the flag of the United Nations, and flags of the various self-governed depended territories. The flag was again updated in 2006, 2008, and 2011, to accommodate for the changes of the national flags and political events. Through the redesigns, the map in the centre of the flag was also changed.

Flags of international organizations

United Nations 

The United Nations is an intergovernmental organization whose stated purposes are to maintain international peace and security, develop friendly relations among nations, achieve international cooperation, and be a centre for harmonizing the actions of nations. It is the world's largest and most familiar international organization. It consists of 193 members, representing almost all of the world's sovereign states.

Its flag consists of the white emblem on the sky blue background. The emblem depicts a azimuthal equidistant projection of the world map, centred on the North Pole, with the globe being bisected in the centre by the Prime meridian and the International Date Line, thus ensuring that no country is at prominence within the flag. The projection of the map extends to 60 degrees south latitude, and includes five concentric circles. The map is inscribed in a wreath consisting of crossed conventionalized branches of the olive tree. The size of the emblem on the flag is one half the width of the flag itself. The flag proportions of the aspect ratio of the flag height to its width, are equal 2:3, 3:5 or to the same proportions as the national flag of any country in which the UN flag is flown. The olive branches are a symbol for peace, and the world map represents all the people and the countries of the world.

The emblem design was officially adopted on 7 December 1946, and the flag, on 20 October 1947.

World Service Authority 

The World Service Authority is a non-profit organization that claims to educate about and promote "world citizenship", "world law", and world government. It is best known for selling unofficial fantasy documents such as World Passports. It was founded in 1953 by Garry Davis. Its flag consists of the organization emblem on the yellow background. The emblem depicts a white globe, with green outline, and green lines of the latitude and longitude. Within the globe stands a green figure of a human, reaching with its limbs to the boundaries of the globe.

Olympic Games 

The Olympic Games are the leading international sporting events featuring summer and winter sports competitions in which thousands of athletes from around the world participate in a variety of competitions. They are considered the world's foremost sports competition with more than 200 teams, representing sovereign states and territories, participating. The Olympic Games are organized by the International Olympic Committee, a non-governmental sports organisation, founded in 1894.

The Olympic flag depicts five interlocking rings, coloured blue, yellow, black, green, and red on a white field. The number of rings represent the five inhabited continents: Europe, Asia, Africa, Oceania, and the Americas, while the six colours were chosen, as each of the colours appears at least once in the flags of every sovereign state on the world. The flag proportions of the aspect ratio of the flag height to its width, are equal 2:3.

The symbol was originally created in 1913 by Pierre de Coubertin, co-founder of the International Olympic Committee. It was adopted in 1913, and first hoisted in 1914. It officially debuted at the 1920 Summer Olympics in Antwerp, Belgium, and gained popularity and widespread use during the lead-up to the 1936 Summer Olympics in Berlin.

The design of the rings was slightly altered in 1988,  and again in 2010.

League of Nations

The League of Nations was the first worldwide intergovernmental organisation whose principal mission was to maintain world peace. It was founded on 10 January 1920 by the Paris Peace Conference that ended the First World War. The main organization ceased operations on 20 April 1946 but many of its components were relocated into the new United Nations.

The semi-official flag of the League of Nations was created in 1939. It features the organization emblem on the white background, placed in the centre. The emblem consists of a blue pentagon, with a white five-pointed star within it, with each of its points touching its vertexes, and a white five-pointed star placed within the other star, that does not touches its sides. It symbolized five inhabited continents, and "five human races". Above the pentagon is a text written in capital blue letters that reads "League of Nations", while below the pentagon, is text written in the same style, that "Société des Nations". They are written respectively in English, and French, two co-official languages of the League of Nations.

In science fiction

Star Trek 
In Star Trek science fiction media franchise created by Gene Roddenberry, Earth is governed by a single world government, the United Earth, which itself is a founding member of the United Federation of Planets.

In 1991 Star Trek VI: The Undiscovered Country film, set in the year 2293, the flag of the United Earth consists of two equally-sized horizontal stripes, of red and blue colour, with a equilateral triangle at the hoist. Within the white triangle is placed the emblem that features a planet, and rising sun behind it, placed within the light blue circle. It depicts the top half of the globe, placed in the bottom portion of the emblem. The planet includes a coordinate grid, and fictional white landmasses. Behind the globe is depicted a top half of a yellow sixteen-pointed star rising over the planet.

In the fourth season of the 2001 Star Trek: Enterprise television series, set in the year 2154, the flag of the United Earth depicts an emblem that includes a circle depicting a map of the world, centred on the prime meridian, and one olive branch placed to the left of the map. The boundary of the circle, landmasses and the branch are colour in golden colour, while the water on the map, in dark blue. The emblem is placed on the white background, slightly off-center to the right. Above and below the emblem are two thin horizontal lines, that consist of small parallelogram placed next to each other. The flag and emblem appears in the episodes "Home", "The Forge", and "Demons". The emblem also appears in the 2020 Star Trek: Lower Decks animated television series, in the episode "An Embarrassment of Dooplers".

In the first season of the 2017 Star Trek: Discovery television series, set in the year 2257, the flag of the United Earth consist of the emblem placed on the dark blue background. The emblem includes a circle depicting a map of the world, centred on the Atlantic Ocean, and one olive branch placed to the left of the map. The boundary of the circle, landmasses and the branch are colour in golden colour, while the water on the map, in dark blue. The flag appears in the episode "Will You Take My Hand?".

In the fourth season of the 2017 Star Trek: Discovery, set in the year 3190, the Solar System is united under the government of the United Earth and Titan. Its emblem consists of the grey circle with beige boundary. On its right, there are two white circles, placed on the circular lines, symbolizing the two words in the orbits around the Sun, represented in the emblem as a golden half-circle in the top left corner of the emblem. Such emblem appears in the episodes "…But to Connect", and "Coming Home". The alternative version of the emblem shown in the episode "Coming Home" depicts a circle with three smaller circles within it. It includes a circle placed to the right includes a map of the world, centred on the Atlantic Ocean, and two smaller circles placed to its right.

In the second season of the 2020 Star Trek: Picard television series, set in the year 2401, the flag of the United Earth consist of the emblem placed on the white background. The emblem includes a circle depicting a map of the world, centred on the Atlantic Ocean, and one olive branch placed to the left of the map. The boundary of the circle, landmasses and the branch are colour in golden colour, while the water on the map, in dark blue.

Futurama 

In the 1999 Futurama science fiction comedy television series, set in the year 3000, the Earth is united under a world government. Its flag, contains thirteen horizontal stripes, alternating between red and white, with a blue canton in the left top corner, containing a globe, with the Americas prominently depicted in the centre. It was based on the flag of the United States. Its aspect ratio of the height of the flag to its width equals 10:19. The flag appeared for the first time in the episode "When Aliens Attack", and was prominently featured in the episode "A Taste of Freedom".

The Expanse 
In the 2015, The Expanse science fiction television series, set in 23rd century, the Earth, together with the Moon and several colonies across the Solar System, are governed by the United Nations, that assumed a form of a united world government. Its flag is modified version of the current flag of the United Nations. It consists of the white emblem placed in the centre, on the dark blue background. The emblem includes a azimuthal equidistant projection of the world map, centred on the North Pole, with the globe being bisected in the centre by the Prime meridian and the International Date Line. The projection of the map extends to 60 degrees south latitude, and includes four concentric circles, with an empty space left in the place, where the most inner circle should be. The projection accounts for the estimates of the sea level rise that is predicted to occur by the 23rd century. As such it depicts altered coast lines of the landmasses. Around the map is placed a circle, with eight smaller circles event distributed around its subconference. They symbolize the Lunar phase, and depicts, from the top clockwise, the first quarter, waxing crescent, new moon, waning crescent, last quarter, waning gibbous, full moon, and waxing gibbous. The elements are inscribed in a wreath consisting of crossed conventionalized branches of the olive tree, which then, are inscribed in two rows of circular lines, cut vertically in the middle. Above the map, between the space left by the lines, are three five-pointed stars, with the middle one, placed higher than the remaining two. Below the emblem, is inscribed text in the white capital letters, that reads "UNITED NATIONS".

See also 
 Cosmopolitanism
 Peace flag
 Earth symbol
 Flag of Mars

References

External links 
 Commons: Category: Flags of Earth
 Commons: Category: International flags

Earth in culture
Global culture
Cosmopolitanism
Earth
Earth
Earth
Earth, flag